The Sea Devil's Eye is a 2000 novel by Mel Odom set in the Forgotten Realms campaign setting. It is the last book in the Threat from the Sea Trilogy.

Plot summary
Iakhovas has caused more destruction than any force since the Time of Troubles, but his true objective has been a mystery until now.

Conception
Author Mel Odom intended the Threat from the Sea trilogy to have major implications for the Forgotten Realms setting: "Basically, an evil that has been buried for thousands of years has risen from the sea and turned against the surface world. A lot happens in these books, and the map of Toril will not be the same afterward. A lot of people are going to be shocked and amazed." Dungeons & Dragons game sourcebook tie-ins were planned to coincide with the novels, allowing players to follow the events of the trilogy in their own campaigns.

References

2000 American novels
Forgotten Realms novels
High fantasy novels
Novels by Mel Odom